Karel Hradil (born 4 January 1937) is a Czechoslovak sprint canoer who competed in the late 1950s. He finished fourth in the C-1 1000 m event at the 1956 Summer Olympics in Melbourne.

References

1937 births
Living people
Canoeists from Prague
Canoeists at the 1956 Summer Olympics
Czechoslovak male canoeists
Olympic canoeists of Czechoslovakia